Prince Guillaume of Luxembourg (Guillaume Marie Louis Christian; born 1 May 1963) is the third son and youngest child of Grand Duke Jean and Grand Duchess Josephine-Charlotte of Luxembourg.

Life 
Prince Guillaume was born in Betzdorf Castle. He attended secondary school in Luxembourg and Switzerland, and received his baccalaureate in Grenoble in 1982. He continued his studies at the University of Oxford in the United Kingdom, and later at Georgetown University in Washington, D.C., where he graduated in 1987. Guillaume was presented the degree Doctor of Humane Letters, honoris causa, at Sacred Heart University's Academic Convocation and Induction of the Class of 2011 on 10 September 2007. The official ceremony welcomed the first-year students to SHU with a formal academic procession and messages from the faculty, student representatives, and president Anthony J. Cernera, PhD.

Guillaume worked for six months at the International Monetary Fund in Washington, and spent two years working for the Commission of the European Communities in Brussels. He is currently a director of ArcelorMittal.

On the night of 10 to 11 September 2000, Prince Guillaume and Princess Sibilla were involved in a serious car accident near Paris. Guillaume was in a coma for almost a month. The transfer of the throne between his father Grand Duke Jean and his brother Henri was postponed from 28 September to 7 October.

Marriage and children 
Prince Guillaume married Sibilla Sandra Weiller y Torlonia (b. 12 June 1968, Neuilly-sur-Seine, France), the second child of millionaire Paul-Annik Weiller and the Italian noblewoman Donna Olimpia Torlonia di Civitella-Cesi (daughter of Alessandro Torlonia, 5th Prince of Civitella-Cesi and Infanta Beatriz of Spain) civilly in Sélestat on 8 September 1994 and religiously at Versailles Cathedral on 24 September 1994, who received the title "Princess of Luxembourg". Guillaume and Sibilla have four children:

Prince Paul-Louis Jean Marie Guillaume de Nassau (b.4 March 1998, Luxembourg).
Prince Léopold Guillaume Marie Joseph de Nassau (b.2 May 2000, Luxembourg).
Princess Charlotte Wilhelmine Maria da Gloria de Nassau (b.2 May 2000, Luxembourg).
Prince Jean André Guillaume Marie Gabriel Marc d'Aviano de Nassau (b.13 July 2004, Luxembourg).

Their sons are in the line of succession to the throne of Luxembourg.

Prince Guillaume is godfather to his nephew, Guillaume, Hereditary Grand Duke of Luxembourg. He is also one of the godparents of Prince Achileas Andrea of Greece and Denmark, the second son of Pavlos, Crown Prince of Greece.

Honours

National
 : Knight Grand Cross of the Order of the Gold Lion of the House of Nassau
 : Knight Grand Cross of the Order of Adolphe of Nassau

Foreign
  Albanian Royal Family: Knight Grand Cross of the Royal Order of Skanderbeg
 : Knight Grand Cross of the Order of the Crown
 : Knight Grand Cross of the Order of Isabella the Catholic
 : Knight Grand Cross of the Order of the Polar Star

References 

1963 births
Living people
Alumni of the University of Oxford
ArcelorMittal
Walsh School of Foreign Service alumni
European Commission
House of Nassau-Weilburg
International Monetary Fund people
Luxembourgian princes
Princes of Bourbon-Parma
Grenoble Alpes University alumni
Sons of monarchs

Grand Crosses of the Order of the Crown (Belgium)
Georgetown University alumni
Knights Grand Cross of the Order of Isabella the Catholic
Luxembourgian officials of the United Nations